Nangna Kappa Pakchade (English: Tears of a Woman) is a 2013 Indian Meitei language film directed by Makhonmani Mongsaba and produced by Thoungamba Thouyangba, under the banner of P.K. Films. The film features Leishangthem Tonthoi and Denny Likmabam in the lead roles. The story of the film was written by Maharaj Kumari Binodini Devi. The film got selection at the 3rd Delhi International Film Festival 2014. The film was screened at Gorky Sadan Hall, Kolkata on 8 March 2014 on the occasion of International  Women's Day. It also got selection at Ladakh International Film Festival 2014 in the Indian Feature section. The movie was screened in the competition section of the Kinshasa International Film Festival (KIFF) 2017, Democratic Republic of Congo.

Nangna Kappa Pakchade is based on the radio play by M. K. Binodini Devi of the same title. This film is the fifth production of P.K. Films. It is a 35 mm celluloid movie.

Synopsis
It narrates the story of a woman Nungshitombi, who fought against her husband with courage by filing a case in the court, where her husband denies Nungshitombi and her child as his own wife and his child.

Cast
 Leishangthem Tonthoi as Nungshitombi
 Denny Likmabam as Lawyer
 Leibakshemba as Ibomcha, Nungshitombi's husband
 R.K. Sorojini Devi as Nungshitombi's aunty
 Lourembam Pishak as Nungshitombi's grandmother
 Baby Aribam Ashmita as Nungshitombi's daughter
 L. Imo
 Bimola as Shopkeeper

Accolades
The film bagged 7 awards at the 9th Manipur State Film Awards 2014. The Best Story award was given to M. K. Binodini Devi posthumously. The movie also received the Special Jury Award with the title Epic Mirror of the Century in Kinshasa International Film Festival 2017.

References

2010s Meitei-language films
2013 films